Topless is a one-woman stage play by Miles Tredinnick. It is set on an open-top sightseeing bus and features tour guide Sandie revealing her personal life whilst pointing out the London sights. The play, produced by The Big Bus Company, ran for two seasons in London, firstly in 1999 (directed by Martin Bailey) and then in 2000 (directed by Miles Tredinnick). The role of Sandie was played by three actresses: Rachael Carter, Alexandra Moses and Serena Hanson. Although the play was written to be performed in theatres, the original production was actually performed on the open-top of a double-decker bus driving around the streets of London.

An acting edition was published by Matador Books in 2006 and a Kindle ebook version came out in 2011.

Bibliography
 Topless (2000 Comedy Hall Books) 
 Jean Marlow Audition Speeches for Women - Extract from Topless. (2001 A&C Black) 
 Topless - new edition (2006 Matador Books)

References

External links
 Topless site

British plays
Comedy plays
1999 plays
Plays set in London
Plays for one performer
Monodrama